Bonsall is a civil parish in the Derbyshire Dales district of Derbyshire, England.  The parish contains 13 listed buildings that are recorded in the National Heritage List for England.  Of these, two are listed at Grade II*, the middle of the three grades, and the others are at Grade II, the lowest grade.  The parish contains the village of Bonsall and the surrounding area.  The listed buildings consist of houses, cottages and associated structures, a farmhouse and an outbuilding, a market cross, two churches, a public house, a sawmill converted for residential use, and a telephone kiosk.



Key

Buildings

References

Citations

Sources

 

Lists of listed buildings in Derbyshire